Maikel van der Werff (born 22 April 1989) is a Dutch professional footballer who plays as a centre-back. He has formerly played for FC Volendam, Vitesse, FC Cincinnati and PEC Zwolle.

Club career

FC Volendam
Born in Hoorn, van der Werff joined FC Volendam at a young age, having played for Hollandia and Always Forward. On 12 November 2008, van der Werff made his FC Volendam debut in a 1–0 victory over Ajax in a KNVB Cup third round tie, replacing Marijn Sterk in the 87th minute. On 13 November 2009, van der Werff scored his first FC Volendam goal in a 5–2 defeat against MVV, netting the equalizer.

PEC Zwolle
On 30 January 2013, after impressing at FC Volendam, van der Werff joined PEC Zwolle on a two-and-a-half-year deal for a fee reported to be around the margin of £140,000. On 10 March 2013, one month after joining the club, van der Werff made his PEC Zwolle debut in a 3–0 defeat against Ajax. On 30 March 2014, van der Werff scored his first PEC Zwolle goal in a 1–1 draw against ADO Den Haag, netting in the 21st minute. van der Werff was part of the squad that won the KNVB Cup in 2014, playing all but one game in their victorious campaign.

Vitesse
On 19 February 2015, it was announced that van der Werff would join Vitesse on the expiry of his contract at the end of the season. On 20 September 2015, van der Werff made his Vitesse debut in a 3–0 victory over local rivals De Graafschap, replacing Kevin Diks in the 27th minute.

He played as Vitesse won the final of the KNVB Cup 2–0 against AZ Alkmaar on 30 April 2017 to help the club, 3-time runners up, to the title for the first time in its 125-year history.

FC Cincinnati
On 2 July 2019, it was announced that van der Werff would join FC Cincinnati as a defender. His contract expired in December 2021 after a disappointing tenure in which he appeared in just 24 matches and spent the entire 2021 season rehabbing injuries. Van der Werff occupied a valuable international roster spot and was on $350,000 in base salary in 2021.

Return to PEC Zwolle
On 21 January 2022, van der Werff returned to PEC Zwolle on a six-months deal.

Career statistics

Honours

Club
PEC Zwolle
KNVB Cup: 2013–14
Vitesse
KNVB Cup: 2016–17

References

External links
 

1989 births
Living people
People from Hoorn
Association football central defenders
Dutch footballers
FC Volendam players
PEC Zwolle players
SBV Vitesse players
Eredivisie players
Eerste Divisie players
FC Cincinnati players
Major League Soccer players
HVV Hollandia players
Dutch expatriate footballers
Dutch expatriate sportspeople in the United States
Expatriate soccer players in the United States
Footballers from North Holland